

Clubs

UEFA club competition winners

Real Madrid hold the record for the most overall titles (24) while Milan has the most UEFA Super Cup wins (5), a record shared with Barcelona and Real Madrid. The Madrid club have a record 14 titles achieved in the UEFA Champions League and its predecessor. Barcelona have a record four titles in the UEFA Cup Winners' Cup while Sevilla have a record of six UEFA Cup and Europa League titles. Finally, German clubs Hamburger SV, Schalke 04, and VfB Stuttgart, as well as Spanish club Villarreal, are the record holders by titles won in the UEFA Intertoto Cup (two each).

Ranking three main European club competitions' winning club sides by winning percentage
This is a ranking of all club sides which have won one of the three main European competitions.

Bayern Munich are the only team to finish a continental competition with a 100% winning record, achieving that milestone in 2020 as part of a modified tournament structure with a final eight in a neutral venue held in a single elimination match due to the COVID-19 pandemic in Europe.

Top 15 club sides 
Qualifying and preliminary round matches are not included, neither are play-off matches; results of penalty shoot-outs are considered the score which preceded them (including extra time).

Table key

List of teams to have won the three main European club competitions

To date, five clubs have won all three main pre-1999 UEFA club competitions, the "European Treble" of European Cup/UEFA Champions League, European/UEFA Cup Winners' Cup, and UEFA Cup/UEFA Europa League. (Link lists only four, not five). 
Although the Cup Winners' Cup no longer exists, 27 of its former winners could still add wins in the other two competitions to achieve this UEFA treble. Nine of those teams are just one trophy away from the feat, including Barcelona and Milan who have both won the Champions League and Cup Winners' Cup and are one Europa League trophy away from achieving the UEFA treble. Other clubs needing Europa League title to achieve the treble are German clubs Hamburg and Borussia Dortmund having previously won the European Cup and the Cup Winners' Cup once each. The remaining five clubs that need to win the Champions League: Atlético Madrid, Tottenham Hotspur, Anderlecht, Valencia, and Parma.

Upon the commencement of the UEFA Europa Conference League in the 2021–22 season, there is a chance for the 32 former winners of the Cup Winners' Cup to win that competition. Any other existing clubs can also win a modern UEFA treble (counting only the Champions, Europa, and Europa Conference Leagues titles) in the future.

Only the first win is shown for any club with multiple wins of the same competition.

Juventus received The UEFA Plaque from the confederation in 1988, in recognition of being the first side in European football history to win all three major UEFA club competitions, and the only one to reach it with in a single coach spell (i.e. Giovanni Trapattoni). They completed the European treble in the shortest amount of time (8 years), while Manchester United reached it in the longest (49 years).

Chelsea is the first club to win all three pre-1999 main UEFA club competitions more than once each, having won the 1997–98 UEFA Cup Winners' Cup, 2018–19 UEFA Europa League, and 2020–21 UEFA Champions League. They won the 2012–13 Europa League, the club's first title in the tournament which completed the treble, after being downgraded as third qualified in the Champions League group stage of that season.

Hamburg, Fiorentina, Ajax, Arsenal and Liverpool are the only clubs to have been runners-up in all three of these competitions.

List of teams to have won all UEFA club competitions
Until the first Europa Conference League final in 2022, Juventus was the only club in association football history to have won every men's official confederation tournaments.

Shows first win only in the case of club's multiple wins of same competition.

German side Hamburg was the only club to have been runners-up in all six UEFA club competitions played until 2021. The club lost in the final of the European Cup Winners' Cup in 1968, the European Super Cup in 1977 and 1983, the final of the European Cup in 1980, the final of the UEFA Cup in 1982, the Intercontinental Cup in 1983, and the finals of the UEFA Intertoto Cup in 1999.

All winners from one country 
Before the abolition of the Cup Winners' Cup in 1999 and after the commencement of the Europa Conference League in 2021, only once have three clubs from the same country – Italy in 1989–90 – won all three main UEFA club competitions in the same season:

In between, clubs from the same country have won both remaining main UEFA club competitions (Champions League and Europa League) in the same season six times: two Spanish teams in 2005–06, 2013–14, 2014–15, 2015–16, and 2017–18, and two English teams in 2018–19.

All finalists from one country 
The 2018–19 season was the first time that all European finals featured representatives from only one country (England). In the Champions League final, Liverpool defeated Tottenham Hotspur, while Chelsea defeated Arsenal in the Europa League final.

Other records
 Milan have lost a record 11 UEFA competition finals: 4 in the European Cup/UEFA Champions League, a shared record of 4 in the Intercontinental Cup (with Argentinian side Independiente), 1 in the Cup Winners' Cup, and 2 in the UEFA Super Cup.
 Juventus played a record 54 consecutive matches in UEFA competitions, stretching from 13 September 1994 to 21 April 1999, and reached four consecutive finals and one semi-final during that period.
 Real Madrid has played (580) and won (339) more games than any other side in Europe, and also hold the records for most goals scored (1,232) and conceded (632) as of 15 March 2023.
 Barcelona has drawn more games than any other team (119) as of 23 February 2023.
 Anderlecht has lost the most games in confederation competitions (148) as of 16 March 2023.
 Jeunesse Esch has the worst goal difference in UEFA competition matches (−183 from 81 games) as of June 2020.

Players

List of players to have won the three main European club competitions
The table below show the nine players who have won all three major pre-1999 UEFA club competitions.

Shows first win only for any player with multiple wins of same competition.

List of players to have won all international club competitions
Although no footballer has ever won all seven competitions, the table below show the only six players who have won five different international competitions organised by UEFA, including the three seasonal tournaments, until the introduction of the Europa Conference League in 2021–22 season (chronological order).

		
Most appearances in UEFA club competitions

Bold = Still active

Top scorers in UEFA club competitions

{| class="wikitable"
|-
!Rank
!Player
!Goals
!
!Goal ratio
!
!
!Club(s)
|-
| align="center" |1
| Cristiano Ronaldo
| align="center" |145
| align="center" |197
| align="center" |
| align="center" |
| align="center" |—
|
|-
| align="center" |2
| Lionel Messi
| align="center" |132
| align="center" |167
| align="center" |
|align=center|
| align="center" |—
|{{small|Barcelona}}
|-
| align="center" |3
| Robert Lewandowski| align="center" |99
| align="center" |138
| align="center" |
| align="center" |
| align="center" |—
|
|-
| align="center" |4
| Karim Benzema| align="center" |91
| align="center" |151
| align="center" |
| align="center" |
| align="center" |—
|
|-
| align="center" |5
| Raúl
| align="center" |77
| align="center" |161
| align="center" |
| rowspan="2" align="center" |
| rowspan="3" align="center" |
|
|-
| align="center" |6
| Filippo Inzaghi
| align="center" |70
| align="center" |114
| align="center" |
|
|-
| align="center" |7
| Andriy Shevchenko
| align="center" |67
| align="center" |143
| align="center" |
| align="center" |
|
|-
| align="center" |8
| Sergio Agüero
| align="center" |63
| align="center" |109
| align="center" |
| align="center" |
| align="center" |
|
|-
| rowspan="2" align="center" |9
| Gerd Müller
| align="center" |62
| align="center" |71
| align="center" |
| align="center" |
| align="center" |
|
|-
| Ruud van Nistelrooy
| align="center" |62
| align="center" |92
| align="center" |
| align="center" |
| align="center" |
|
|}Bold''' = Still active

Other records 
 In September 2021, Harry Kane became the first player to score a hat-trick in each of the Champions League, Europa League, and Europa Conference League.
 Paolo Maldini is the player with the most European appearances for a single club (174 for Milan).

Managers

List of managers to have won the three main European club competitions

The table below show the only three managers who have won all three major former and current UEFA club competitions.

Shows first win only for any manager with multiple wins of same competition.

French manager Arsène Wenger is the only manager who has been runner-up in three major UEFA club competitions. He finished runner-up in the 1991–92 European Cup Winners' Cup with Monaco and in the 1999–2000 UEFA Cup and 2005–06 UEFA Champions League with Arsenal.

List of managers to have won all international club competitions
Although no manager has ever won all seven competitions, the table below shows the only one to have won five different international tournaments organised by UEFA, including the three seasonal tournaments, until the introduction of the Europa Conference League in 2021–22 season.

Shows first win only in the case of manager's multiple wins of same competition.

Attendance

Highest attendance for a UEFA club competition

References

 
Association football-related lists
European records